Biomega may refer to:

 Biomega (bicycles), a Copenhagen-based, Danish bicycle manufacturer
 Biomega (manga), a 2004–2009 cyberpunk action manga by Tsutomu Nihei